The National Union of Baptist Churches (Union Nacional de Iglesias Bautistas de Costa Rica) is a Baptist denominational group in the country of Costa Rica.

The National Union of Baptist Churches was formed in 1981, when churches withdrew from the Baptist Convention of Costa Rica to continue cooperation with the Southern Baptist Convention.

In 1995, the National Union had 17 churches with 1040 members.

Christian organizations established in 1981
Baptist denominations in North America
Baptist denominations established in the 20th century